U Scorpii (U Sco) is a recurrent nova system; one of 10 known recurring novae in the Milky Way galaxy. Located near the northern edge of the constellation Scorpius it normally has a magnitude of 18, but reaches a magnitude of about 8 during outbursts. Outbursts have been observed in 1863, 1906, 1936, 1979, 1987, 1999, 2010, and 2022.

The 2010 outburst was predicted to occur April 2009 ± 1.0 year, based on observations during quiescence following the 1999 outburst. The U Sco 2010 eruption faded by 1 magnitude in 1 day, and by 4 magnitudes in 6 days. By February 6 it was dimmer than magnitude 13. Between February 10–19, it was flickering around magnitude 14. The eruption ended on day 64, which is the fastest observed decline to quiescence of recurring nova.  This eruption of U Sco is now the best-observed nova event with 22,000 magnitudes already accumulated. Astronomers have predicted that another eruption of U Sco will occur in 2020±2. This prediction was correct; it brightened to +7.8 magnitude on 6 June 2022.

Originally identified in 1863 by English astronomer N.R. Pogson, U Scorpii was the third recurrent nova to be identified, in the years preceding World War II by Helen L. Thomas.

References

External links
 http://www.phys.lsu.edu/dept/people/schaefer.html
 U Scorpii in Outburst
 Long-term monitoring of the recurrent nova U Scorpii (AAVSO  2010 April 9)
 AAVSO: Quick Look View of AAVSO Observations (get recent magnitude estimates for U Sco)

Recurrent novae
Scorpius (constellation)
Scorpii, U